Gary Patrick Ayles (born September 25, 1964) is a Racecar driver born in the United Kingdom.

Ayles raced in the British F3 championship in the late 1980s before making the switch to touring car racing. He competed in the British Touring Car Championship in 1991 driving for Toyota alongside Andy Rouse, and filled in for one race in 1992. He was offered a drive with the factory Peugeot team in the Superturismo series as teammate to Fabrizio Giovanardi. In his three years with the team he finished runner up in the championship in 1992 to the Italian and scored several wins during his time in the series against such names as Gabriele Tarquini, Roberto Ravaglia and Emanuele Pirro. For 1995, he drove for the factory-backed Ferrari Club Italia team in the 1995 BPR Global GT Series, driving a Ferrari F40.

Ayles returned to the BTCC in 1996, again driving for Andy Rouse in a Nissan, but did not enjoy the same success. In 1997 he raced a McLaren F1 GTR in the 1997 FIA GT Championship for Parabolica Motorsport. The team achieved a brace of top six finishes against the factory teams, regularly the top privateers. This car is replicated within the video game Project CARS 3. The year also included a one-off outing at Silverstone in the 1997 British GT Championship, where he took the overall victory. He has entered the Le Mans 24hr four times with a best finish of 9th in the LMGT1 class and 18th overall at the 1995 24 Hours of Le Mans driving a Ferrari F40.

Ayles became a team owner in 2000, when he established GA Motorsport, which has entered cars in the BTCC since 2000, racing as Team Sureterm for much of 2004. At the beginning of 2005, Ayles sold his share in the team to Mike Thompson, which Thompson since rebranded as Quest Racing. After planning to enter a new team in 2006, he formed the A-Tech team, which entered the BTCC for 2007, with a pair of Alfa Romeos for David Pinkney and Richard Marsh. Currently (2011) he is involved with Lotus UK's GT4 race programme with the Evora.

He co-owns a heritage vehicle shipping and delivery company, Bespoke Handling.

Racing record

Complete British Touring Car Championship results
(key) (Races in bold indicate pole position - 1 point awarded all in 1996 only) (Races in italics indicate fastest lap - 1 point awarded 1988–1989 in class)

 – Race was stopped due of heavy rain. No points were awarded.

‡ Endurance driver.

Complete Italian Touring Car Championship results

References

External links
 Profile on Historic Racing

British Touring Car Championship drivers
British racing drivers
24 Hours of Le Mans drivers
British Formula 3000 Championship drivers
1965 births
Living people